To Serve Them All My Days is a British television drama series, adapted by Andrew Davies from R. F. Delderfield's 1972 novel To Serve Them All My Days. It was first broadcast by the BBC over 13 episodes in 1980 and 1981. It was broadcast in Australia in 1981 by the Australian Broadcasting Commission, and in 1982 by PBS in the United States as part of their Masterpiece Theatre anthology series.

Plot
David Powlett-Jones, a coal miner's son from South Wales, who has risen from the ranks and been commissioned as a Second Lieutenant in the First World War. In 1918, after being injured and shell-shocked, he is hired to teach modern history at Bamfylde School, a fictional public school in North Devon, in the southwest of England, where he wins the respect and acclaim of colleagues and pupils. He serves under headmaster Algy Herries, forms a friendship with Ian Howarth  and marries Beth. He engages in a long bitter rivalry with the jingoistic science master Carter but the two of them later become friends. Powlett-Jones is eventually appointed headmaster.

Production
The series was filmed over 11 months in 1980, with Devon and Dorset locations including Milton Abbey School in Dorset. Besides the exterior filming, indoor scenes were filmed on a soundstage.

Cast
John Duttine as David Powlett-Jones
Frank Middlemass as Algy Herries
Alan MacNaughtan as Howarth
Patricia Lawrence as Ellie Herries
Neil Stacy as Carter
Susan Jameson as Christine Forster
Charles Kay as Alcock
Kim Braden as Julia
John Welsh as Cordwainer
Cyril Luckham as Sir Rufus Creighton
Simon Gipps-Kent as Chad Boyer
Belinda Lang as Beth
Nicholas Lyndhurst as Dobson
David King as Barnaby
Phillip Joseph as Emrys Powlett-Jones
Michael Turner as Brigadier Cooper
Norman Bird as Alderman Blunt

Reception
Writing for The New York Times, John J. O'Connor described the production as "a richly textured tapestry crammed with the social details that were the speciality of Mr. Delderfield", with "a steady flow of insightful and touching moments". He praised the performances of the cast and that of Duttine in particular. People magazine called the series a "colorful chronicle of post-World War I England that never crosses over to the gooey side of sentiment." In a review for the DVD release in 2011, PopMatters was less enthusiastic, calling Delderfield's material "inconsequential" and writing: "The action veers sluggishly from the mildly diverting to the excruciatingly dull." The review summarised the series as "basically a dated, dull, tiresome, tedious old drama by an author whose reputation is far from robust."

The adaptation was nominated in the Best Drama Series category at the 1981 British Academy Television Awards and in the Outstanding Limited Series category at the 1983 Primetime Emmy Awards.

DVD release
All episodes of To Serve Them All My Days have been made available on DVD in the UK, Australia and the US.

References

External links
 

BBC television dramas
Television shows written by Andrew Davies
1980s British drama television series
1980 British television series debuts
1981 British television series endings
Television shows set in Devon
Television shows based on British novels
English-language television shows